Sidney Leo Stebel (June 28, 1923 – July 28, 2020) was an American writer and creative writing teacher, associated with Ray Bradbury. He was script consultant to the 1975 film Picnic at Hanging Rock.  He wrote the scripts for The Small World: "The Gypsy Children of Granada" and Perilous Voyage, in collaboration with Robert Weverka. He died in July 2020 at the age of 97.

Works
The Small World: "The Gypsy Children of Granada" with Robert Weverka Television Pilot (1963)
Perilous Voyage with Robert Weverka Television movie (1968)
The Collaborator (1968)
The Shoe Leather Treatment (1980)

References

1923 births
2020 deaths
Schoolteachers from Iowa
American writers